Troop is the self-titled first album by new jack swing group Troop. Released on June 7, 1988, the album charted at number nineteen on the US R&B albums chart.

Track listing
"Mamacita" (Gerald LeVert, Eddie Levert, Marc Gordon) – 5:37
"My Heart" (Chuckii Booker) – 6:09
"Still in Love" (Attala Zane Giles, Lawrence McNeil, Steve Russell, Tony Haynes) – 5:08
"Happy Relationship" (Brownmark, Keith Woodsom) – 4:23
"I Like That" (Gerald LeVert, Eddie Levert, Marc Gordon) – 4:16
"Young Girl" (Cliff Wright, Steve Russell, Zack Harmon) – 6:05
"She's My Favorite Girl" (Art Zamora, Michael Carpenter) – 5:17
"Watch Me Dance" (Dennis Nelson, Lawrence McNeil, Steve Russell, Wayne Vaughn) – 4:50
"Mamacita" (Extended 12" Mix) (Gerald LeVert, Marc Gordon) – 6:51

Charts

Album

Singles

External links
 Troop-Troop at Discogs

References

1988 debut albums
Troop (band) albums
Atlantic Records albums